Chitra Ganesh (born 1975) is a visual artist based in Brooklyn, New York. Ganesh's work across media includes: charcoal drawings, digital collages, films, web projects, photographs, and wall murals. Ganesh draws from mythology, literature, and popular culture to reveal feminist and queer narratives from the past and to imagine new visions of the future.

Early life and education

Early life and influences 
Chitra Ganesh is the daughter of Indian immigrant parents, born and raised in Brooklyn, New York. Growing up, she was indulged in the visual representation of Bollywood posters, comics, and literature. For the artist, 'visual languages in Bollywood's orbit became conduits for expressing an expanded sense of the real, heightening the fantastical and symbolic via a hybrid use of graphics and paint.'

As a youngster from a diaspora community, she was exposed to Amar Chitra Katha (ACK), a famous Indian comic series based on religious and mythological narratives. It was one of her daily visual references, both in New York City at home and in India during summer trips. Children in India and the diaspora have been raised for decades with these comics, which are supposed to teach the South Asian population culturally.

Ganesh's interest in ACK is crucial as many of her works reinterpret and redefine the comic. She was fascinated by the history of ACK and its portrayal of women. When she read the comic as an adult, she realized how often information was presented as timeless, trans-historical, and authentic. However, "the comic actually came with its own arguments, prescribed codes of conduct that maintain hierarchies of gender, skin color, and caste among others." Hence, she had a range of experiences reading the comics again as she was interested in how reading with her adult eyes made her realize that comics that were just submerged in her memory banks.

Ganesh describes learning how to sew, embroider, and draw kolams from a young age- which she later realized were 'gendered forms of creativity.' Her parents encouraged her to pursue art as a hobby, and enrolled her in art classes at a young age; however this was never seen as a viable career option, as the field was considered to be financially unstable.

Education 
Ganesh graduated from the prestigious Saint Ann's School, and magna cum laude from Brown University with a BA in Comparative Literature and Art-Semiotics. She attended the Skowhegan School of Painting and Sculpture in 2001 and received her MFA in Visual Arts from Columbia University, New York in 2002. Ganesh's studies in literature, semiotics, and social theory paved a way for her to become steadily engaged with narrative and deconstruction that animates her work.

During her time at Brown University as an undergraduate student, she was passionate for semiotics, feminism, post-coloniality, poetry, and translation. At the time, she encountered artists like Jaishri Abichandani, DJ Rekha, and other women from the South Asian Women's Creative Collective (SAWCC), which is an organization for South Asians who are interested in the arts. The late 1990s was an essential time for her because she was influenced by the interactions with South Asian female artists, and by her involvement in a number of progressive communities.

After her mother's death in 1998, Chitra Ganesh was hesitant about becoming an artist. Having a profession as an artist was nearly non-existent in her community. Also, she thought becoming an artist was "an option for the wealthy folks or people from a family of artists."

At Columbia University, New York, she focused on finding images that reflected her subjectivity in mainstream art and culture that often meant "reckoning with the anthropological colonial lens that prevail in both the selection and contextualization of art objects, alongside disturbing mass mediated repetitions of South Asian subjects circulated in America." As an artist and a scholar, she realized how important it was for her to articulate her own thoughts and approaches to object making and the cultural histories that informed them. She noticed a distinct absence in representation of South Asian culture, art history, and contemporary art in her curriculum, and took additional classes in anthropology and South Asian studies to "fill in some of these gaps."

Career and inspirations 
After graduating from Brown University, she decided to get a job teaching junior high school in Washington Heights and continued to work in education (notably teaching English, and Social Studies). However, when her mother died, her life took a drastic turn. After the incident, she began teaching at junior high and kept painting in her apartment; she declared her career as an artist and realized the life is indeed very short.

Inspirations 
Ganesh is inspired by non-canonical narratives and figures, botched love stories, present-day imperialism, lesser-known Hindu/Buddhist icons, nineteenth-century European fairytales, girl rock, and contemporary visual culture, such as Bollywood posters, anime, and comic books. Her early 24-page comic book, Tales of Amnesia (2002–2007), appropriates scenes from Amar Chitra Katha; the original work's male warrior heroes were replaced with women, through whom Ganesh offer new female subjectivities.

The Unknowns 
Ganesh's series, The Unknowns—a series of mixed-media works on canvas—explore “the relationship between anonymity, mass-mediated images, and the monumental, in the construction of a feminine iconography.” The series brings to mind large subway advertisements and posters and utilize various techniques including painting, collage, and commercial printing processes.

In “Knowing ‘The Unknowns’: The Artwork of Chitra Ganesh,” Svati P. Shah encourages viewers to consider the formal elements of Ganesh’s work instead of simply viewing them as existing in opposition to the art history canon. Shah describes the origins of the subjects’ of The Unknowns as coming from the “margins of a mythic history” and Ganesh's ability to interrogate "the gaze" through this series.

Other works and publications 
Another project by Ganesh that sheds light on the construction of feminine iconography is Eyes of Time, a 4.5-by-12 ft multimedia mural conceived for the Brooklyn Museum in New York.There are three figures in the mural that shows "the iteration of feminine power and the cyclical relationship of time." The artist explores the South Asian traditions of Saki, a divine female empowerment, and sacred Indian portrayals of the Greatest Goddess Kali. She not only paints the mural but also associates her work with the collection objects of Brooklyn Museum, which are accompanied with her wall mural.

Ganesh has also contributed to publications such as the anthology Juicy Mother 2, which was a finalist for the Lambda Literary Awards and was edited by Jennifer Camper. She has held residencies at the Lower Manhattan Cultural Council, New York University, Headlands Center for the Arts, Smack Mellon Studios, and the Skowhegan School of Painting and Sculpture, among others.

In 2020, Ganesh created a large-scale installation on the facade of the Leslie-Lohman Museum of Art in New York. Titled “A city will share her secrets if you know how to ask”, the artist’s massive installation covers many of the museum’s windows in vinyl prints of the artist’s iconic humanoid hybridizations.

Awards and honors
Ganesh is the recipient of numerous awards and fellowships that include:
Virtual artist residency at the University of Michigan Museum of Art (2020–2021)
Robina Foundation Fellow for Arts and Human Rights (2015, 2016)
US Art in Embassies Program Resident in NIROX, South Africa (2015)
Estelle Lebowitz Endowed Visiting Artist (2015)
Kirloskar Visiting Scholar at RISD (2014)
Artist in Residence at New York University's Asian/Pacific/American Studies Program (2013, 2014) 
John Simon Guggenheim Memorial Foundation Fellowship in the Creative Arts (2012)
The Art Matters Foundation Grant (2010)
The Joan Mitchell Foundation Award for Painting and Sculpture (2010)
The New York Foundation for the Arts Artist’s Fellowship (2009, 2005)
Columbia University Dean's Fellowship (2000)

Selected exhibitionsCharlie, 2002, MoMA PS1, New YorkHer Secret Missions, 2003, Momenta Art, Brooklyn, NY (catalog)East of the Sun West of the Moon, 2004, White Columns, New York739 feet running wall, 2005, Gwangju Contemporary Art Museum, Gwangju, Korea1 x 1, 2005, Jersey City Museum, New JerseyThe Gift: Building a Collection, 2005, Queens Museum of Art, New YorkChitra Ganesh, 2007, Haas & Fischer, Zurich, Switzerland Upon Her Precipice, 2007, Thomas Erben, NYContradictions and Complexities, 2008, d.e.n. contemporary art, Culver City, CaliforniaOn Site 2: Her Silhouette Returns, 2009, MoMA PS1, organized by Klaus BiesenbachWord of God(ess):Chitra Ganesh, 2011, The Andy Warhol Museum, PittsburghThe Strangling Power of Dust and Stars, 2011, Gallery Nature Morte, BerlinShe, the Question, 2012, Gothenburg Kunsthalle, SwedenThe Ghost Effect in Real Time, 2012, Jack Tilton Gallery, NYFlickering Myths, 2012, Gallery Wendi Norris, San Francisco (catalog)A Zebra Among Horses, 2013, Gallery Espace, New Delhi, IndiaChitra Ganesh, 2013, Twelve Gates Gallery, PhiladelphiaHer Nuclear Waters…., 2013, Socrates Sculpture Park Billboard Series, NYDrawing from the present…, 2014, Lakereen Gallery, Mumbai, India Secrets Told: Index of the Disappeared, 2014, New York University, NY Chitra: Ganesh: Eyes of Time, 2014-15, Brooklyn Museum, New YorkProtest Fantasies, 2015, Gallery Wendi Norris, San Francisco, CaliforniaThe Scorpion Gesture'', 2018, Rubin Museum of Art, New York, NY

References

External links
Chitra Ganesh at Gallery Nature Morte
Chitra Ganesh at The Arts Trust
Review of work Online Magazine
Chitra Ganesh at Wavehill.org
Further information, texts and images from the Saatchi Gallery
Chitra Ganesh on ArtNet.com
Chitra Ganesh at Haas & Fischer

1975 births
Living people
American artists
Columbia University School of the Arts alumni
Feminist artists
People from Brooklyn
American LGBT artists
American women artists of Indian descent
Skowhegan School of Painting and Sculpture alumni
Saint Ann's School (Brooklyn) alumni
Brown University alumni
Artists from New York City
American muralists
21st-century American women artists
Women muralists
21st-century LGBT people